Zülpich is a town in North Rhine-Westphalia, Germany between Aachen and Bonn. It belongs to the district of Euskirchen.

History 
The town is commonly agreed to be the site with the Latin name of Tolbiacum, famous for the Battle of Tolbiac, fought between the Franks under Clovis I and the Alemanni; the traditional date is 496, corrected in many modern accounts to 506.  The battle is commemorated in the names of the Rue de Tolbiac and the Tolbiac Métro station in Paris.

On 1 January 1969, the former municipalities of Bessenich, Dürscheven, Enzen, Langendorf, Linzenich-Lövenich, Merzenich, Nemmenich, Oberelvenich, Rövenich, Sinzenich, Ülpenich, Weiler in der Ebene, and Wichterich were incorporated into the borough of Zülpich. On 1 January 1972, Bürvenich, Füssenich, and Schwerfen (part of Veytal) were added.

Sights
 Zülpich Castle
 Wassersportsee Zülpich

Twinnings
 Blaye, France
 Kangasala, Finland
 Elst, Netherlands

Notable people
 Ferdinand von Hompesch zu Bolheim, (1744-1805), Grand Master of the Order of Malta
 Theodor Weber, (1836-1906), bishop
 Theo Breuer (born 1956), author and editor
 Silke Rottenberg, (born 1972), former national football player, grew up in Zülpich
 Oliver Krischer, (born 1969), biologist and politician (The Greens), Member of Bundestag since 2009, lives in Düren

References

External links

Towns in North Rhine-Westphalia
Euskirchen (district)